Jonathan Brown (born December 7, 1992) is an American football kicker who is a free agent. He played college football at Louisville.

College career 
Brown played college football and soccer for Kentucky and Louisville.

Professional career

Cincinnati Bengals 
On May 10, 2016, the Cincinnati Bengals signed Brown as an undrafted free agent. He was then waived by the team on August 30, 2016 and then later re-signed with the team on January 20, 2017. Brown was released by the Bengals again on August 1, 2017, but later was signed to the team's practice squad on December 28, 2017. He signed a reserve/future contract with the Bengals on January 1, 2018. Brown was waived by the Bengals on September 1, 2018.

San Francisco 49ers 
On March 8, 2019, the San Francisco 49ers signed Brown to a two-year contract. He was waived on July 23, 2019.

Jacksonville Jaguars 
On December 31, 2019, he signed a reserve/future contract with the Jaguars. On April 28, 2020, Brown was waived by the Jaguars. He was signed to the team's practice squad on October 9, and promoted to the active roster on October 12. He made his NFL debut on October 18 and made one of two field goal attempts. Those kicks were his first attempted kicks of any type in American football at any level. He was the fifth kicker used by the Jaguars in the season which was an NFL record. He was waived on October 22 and re-signed to the practice squad two days later. He was released on November 23.

References

External links
 Louisville bio
 49ers bio
 CBS Sports bio

1992 births
Living people
Players of American football from Mississippi
American football placekickers
Kentucky Wildcats men's soccer players
Louisville Cardinals men's soccer players
People from Clinton, Mississippi
Louisville Cardinals football players
Cincinnati Bengals players
San Francisco 49ers players
Soccer players from Mississippi
Jacksonville Jaguars players
Association footballers not categorized by position
Association football players not categorized by nationality